The Dream, the Space is the debut studio album by Japanese metalcore band Crossfaith. It was released on 20 April 2011 through Zestone Records in Japan and Tragic Hero Records worldwide.

Critical reception

The album received positive reviews from critics. Rock Sound gave it 8 out of 10 and said: "Blowing us away with their stunning The Artificial Theory for the Dramatic Beauty at the tail end of last year, Crossfaith basically promise more of the same on this here follow up. Imagine if Bullet for My Valentine were to do all their shopping in Cyberdog and the results wouldn't be too far removed from what Crossfaith are offering; a near-perfect synthesis of technology and metal that should win the hearts and minds of rockers and rivetheads alike. Like its predecessor, The Dream, the Space is far too short for its own good but this only leaves us wanting more."

Track listing

Personnel
Crossfaith
 Kenta Koie – lead vocals
 Kazuki Takemura – guitars
 Terufumi Tamano – keyboards, programming, samples, backing vocals
 Hiroki Ikegawa – bass
 Tatsuya Amano – drums

Additional musicians
 Masato Hayakawa of Coldrain – guest vocals on track 7

References

2011 debut albums
Crossfaith albums